Jody Kimone Brown (born 16 April 2002) is a Jamaican footballer who plays as a forward for the Florida State Seminoles and the Jamaica women's national team.

Early life and education

Montverde Academy
Brown attends Montverde Academy in Montverde, Florida, a town near Orlando, where she helped lead the soccer team to back-to-back state championships in 2018–19. As a junior in 2019, she recorded 32 goals and 9 assists. The same year, she was named Girls Soccer Player of the Year by the Orlando Sentinel and Florida Dairy Farmers Miss Soccer.

Florida State University

After graduating from Montverde Academy, Brown moved to Florida State University in August 2020.

International career
Brown has represented Jamaica on the senior national team as well as the under-15, under-17, and under-20 national teams. She competed at two CONCACAF Girls' Under-15 Championship editions in (2014 and 2016), the 2016 CONCACAF Women's U-17 Championship, the 2018 CONCACAF Women's U-20 Championship and the 2018 CONCACAF Women's U-17 Championship qualification. She made her senior debut in 2018 at the age of 16. The same year, she was the youngest player competing at the 2018 CONCACAF Women's Championship, the qualifying tournament for the 2019 FIFA Women's World Cup. Brown was the top scorer of the tournament with four goals.

At age 17, Brown was selected for Jamaica's 2019 Women's World Cup squad. She made her World Cup debut during the team's first group stage match against Brazil in Grenoble.

International goals
Scores and results list Jamaica's goal tally first

Honours
Florida State Seminoles

 NCAA Division I Women's Soccer Tournament: 2021
 ACC Women's Soccer Tournament: 2020, 2021, 2022
 ACC Women's Regular Season Champions: 2020, 2022
Jamaica

 CONCACAF Women's Championship third place: 2018, 2022
Individual

 CONCACAF Women's Championship Young Player of the Tournament: 2018
 CONCACAF Women's Best XI: 2018

References

External links

 Player profile at 2019 FIFA Women's World Cup

2002 births
Living people
Women's association football forwards
Jamaican women's footballers
Jamaica women's international footballers
2019 FIFA Women's World Cup players
Pan American Games competitors for Jamaica
Footballers at the 2019 Pan American Games
Jamaican expatriate women's footballers
Jamaican expatriate sportspeople in the United States
Expatriate women's soccer players in the United States
Montverde Academy alumni
Florida State Seminoles women's soccer players
Soccer players from Florida
People from Saint Catherine Parish